Sami Abdullah (born 17 February 1987) is a Sudanese defender playing for the Sudanese club Al-Hilal. He came to Al-Hilal in June 2009, on a free transfer from Ahli Madani.

References

External links
 

1987 births
Living people
Sudanese footballers
Sudan international footballers
Al-Hilal Club (Omdurman) players

Association football defenders